Ice Angel is a 2000 fantasy film from Fox Family. It is also known as On Thin Ice: Going For The Gold.  It is loosely based on the 1941 film Here Comes Mr. Jordan.

Plot
The film tells the story of Matt Clark (Aaron Smolinski), a male hockey player who dies in a game due to an accident made by the angel Allan, (Brendan Beiser) that caused the hockey player to die when he was trying to get to a choking man. As four days have passed where Matt has been pronounced dead, cremated and buried on national television, Allan is instructed by his boss Peter (Alec Willows) to put Matt in a suitable body. Matt comes back to life as Sara Bryan (Nicholle Tom), a female figure skater who fell into a coma who just passed into Heaven. Both share the dream of competing in the Winter Olympics. The male hockey player specified that if he returned to earth, he wanted to have a chance to win an Olympic Gold medal on ice, leaving the detail that he wanted to be on the hockey team implied. With time running short, Matt in Sara's body has to get skating lessons from Sara's one-time rival (Tara Lipinski) if he wishes to earn gold.

Cast
 Nicholle Tom as Sara Bryan
 Tara Lipinski as Tracy Hannibal
 Nancy Kerrigan as Julie
 Aaron Smolinski as Matt Clark
 Gwynyth Walsh as Mrs. Bryan
 Thomas Calabro as Ray Rossovich
 Alan Thicke as Coach Parker
 Brendan Beiser as Allan
 Andrew Johnston as Mr. Bryan
 Alec Willows as Peter
 Elvis Stojko as Doug

Reception

External links

ABC Family original films
2000 television films
2000 films
2000s fantasy comedy films
Figure skating films
Saban Entertainment films
2000 comedy films
2000s English-language films